The 1925–26 Gold Cup was the 14th edition of the Gold Cup, a cup competition in Northern Irish football.

The tournament was won by Belfast Celtic for the second time, defeating Cliftonville 3–0 in the final at Windsor Park.

Results

First round

|}

Quarter-finals

|}

Semi-finals

|}

Final

References

1925–26 in Northern Ireland association football